Gaag Khurd is a village in Pindra Tehsil of Varanasi district in the Indian state of Uttar Pradesh. Only one shia Muslim Village between Varanasi and Jaunpur District. The village comes under Gangkala gram panchayat. The village is about 27 kilometers North-West of Varanasi city, 266 kilometers South-East of state capital Lucknow and 791 kilometers South-East of the national capital Delhi.

Demography
Gang Khurd has a total population of 517 people amongst 48 families. Sex ratio of Gaag Khurd is 1,093 and child sex ratio is 1,132. Uttar Pradesh state average for both ratios is 912 and 902 respectively .

Transportation
Gang Khurd can be accessed by road and does not have a railway station of its own. Closest railway station to this village is Babatpur Railway Station (14 kilometres North-East). Nearest operational airports are Varanasi airport (9 kilometres North-East) and Allahabad Airports (130 kilometres West).

See also

Pindra Tehsil
Pindra (Assembly constituency)

Notes
  All demographic data is based on 2011 Census of India.

References 

Villages in Varanasi district